The 2016 Rio de Janeiro municipal election took place on 2 October and 30 October 2016 to elect a Mayor, a Vice Mayor and 51 City Councillors for the administration of the city. The incumbent Mayor, Eduardo Paes of the Brazilian Democratic Movement Party (PMDB), was term-limited and couldn't run for re-election. The election took place against a backdrop of mass protests and the impeachment of president Dilma Rousseff of the Workers' Party (PT) earlier that year.

Candidates

Debates

First round

Second round

Opinion polls

First round

Second round

Results

Mayor

City Councillors

Notes

References

History of Rio de Janeiro (city)
Mayoral elections in Brazil
October 2016 events in South America
Rio de Janiero mayoral